The Federal Procurement Data System (FPDS) is a single source for US government-wide procurement data.

The Federal Procurement Data Center (FPDC), part of the U.S. General Services Administration, manages the Federal Procurement Data System (FPDS), which is operated and maintained by IBM. The FPDS-NG is the current central repository of information on Federal contracting. The system contains detailed information on contract actions over $3,000 (FY2004 and later data). The Executive departments and agencies award over $200 billion annually for goods and services. The system can identify who bought what, from whom, for how much, when and where.

Issues
Subsidiaries and predecessor companies of large corporations are oftentimes listed in the database as small businesses.
Data are under constant review and revision. For example, during FY2008, over $100 billion worth of entries was modified.
Contracts to large companies have been misidentified as contracts to small businesses.  Furthermore, small business set-asides were classified as getting awarded to large corporations
Responsible Contracting Officers fail to update their procurement data because either they are negligent of their job responsibilities or providing the data would reveal that sole source contracts are being awarded to certain preferred vendors without a competitive bidding process in violation of the Federal Acquisition Regulation.

See also 

Government procurement
Federal Acquisition Regulation
Government procurement in the United States
Top 100 Contractors of the U.S. federal government
Sustainable procurement

References

External links
 

General Services Administration
Government procurement in the United States